Peter Copeland (born 27 December 1933) is a South African former cricketer. He played in 29 first-class matches for Eastern Province from 1956/57 to 1962/63.

See also
 List of Eastern Province representative cricketers

References

External links
 

1933 births
Living people
South African cricketers
Eastern Province cricketers
People from Makhanda, Eastern Cape
Cricketers from the Eastern Cape